The 144th Ohio Infantry Regiment, sometimes 144th Ohio Volunteer Infantry (or 144th OVI) was an infantry regiment in the Union Army during the American Civil War.

Service
The 144th Ohio Infantry was organized at Camp Chase in Columbus, Ohio, and mustered in as an Ohio National Guard unit of 834 men for 100 days service on May 11, 1864, under the command of Colonel Samuel H. Hunt.

Companies were assigned to duty as follows: Companies G and K in the defenses of Baltimore; Company B at Camp Parole, Annapolis, Maryland; Company E at Wilmington, Delaware; Company I at Fort Dix, Relay House. The remainder of the regiment was stationed at Fort McHenry. The regiment was attached to 1st Separate Brigade, VIII Corps, Middle Department. The regiment was relieved from duty at Baltimore and moved to Relay House. Attached to Kenley's Independent Brigade, VIII Corps.

The 144th Ohio Infantry mustered out of service at Camp Chase on August 31, 1864.

Detailed service
Left Ohio for Baltimore, Md., May 11.  Battle of Monocacy Junction, Md., July 9. Moved to Washington, D.C., July 13. Advance to Winchester and Snicker's Gap July 14–20. Operations in Shenandoah Valley July 20 to August 13. Repulse of attack by Mosby at Berryville August 13. Guard duty near Berryville until August 20.

Casualties
The regiment lost a total of 63 men during service; 10 enlisted men killed or mortally wounded, 53 enlisted men died of disease.

Commanders
 Colonel Samuel H. Hunt

See also

 List of Ohio Civil War units
 Ohio in the Civil War

References
 Dyer, Frederick H. A Compendium of the War of the Rebellion (Des Moines, IA:  Dyer Pub. Co.), 1908.
 Ohio Roster Commission. Official Roster of the Soldiers of the State of Ohio in the War on the Rebellion, 1861–1865, Compiled Under the Direction of the Roster Commission (Akron, OH: Werner Co.), 1886–1895.
 Reid, Whitelaw. Ohio in the War: Her Statesmen, Her Generals, and Soldiers (Cincinnati, OH: Moore, Wilstach, & Baldwin), 1868. 
Attribution

External links
 Ohio in the Civil War: 144th Ohio Volunteer Infantry by Larry Stevens

Military units and formations established in 1864
Military units and formations disestablished in 1864
1864 disestablishments in Ohio
Units and formations of the Union Army from Ohio
1864 establishments in Ohio